Zuzana Števulová (born 1983) is a Slovak lawyer, lecturer and activist who assists migrants. She was the first Slovak to be given an International Women of Courage Award.

Life
Števulová was born in Slovakia in 1983. She is lecturer at the University of Trnava in Slovakia. She helped create the Integration Policy for the Slovak Republic.

She had campaigned for the rights of refugees and migrants arriving in Europe and in 2016 she was the first Slovak to be given an International Women of Courage Award in Washington DC. She has won important cases to overturn refusals in Slovakia to grant political asylum and to support the rights of the migrants in her country.

References

1983 births
Living people
Slovak activists
Slovak women activists
Recipients of the International Women of Courage Award
Academic staff of the University of Trnava
Slovak women lawyers
21st-century Slovak lawyers